Tomigerus is a genus of air-breathing, tropical land snails, terrestrial pulmonate gastropod mollusks in the family Odontostomidae.

Species 
This genus contains the following species:
 Tomigerus clausus Spix, 1827
 Tomigerus corrugatus Ihering, 1905
 Tomigerus esamianus Salgado & Coelho, 1990
 Tomigerus laevis Ihering, 1905
 Tomigerus matthewsi Salgado & Leme, 1991
 Tomigerus pilsbryi Baker, 1914
 Tomigerus rochai Ihering, 1905

Synonyms:
 Tomigerus gibberulus is a synonym of Digerus gibberulus (Burrow, 1815) - extinct
 Tomigerus turbinatus is a synonym of Biotocus turbinatus (Pfeiffer, 1845) - extinct

How the shell is carried 
It is evident from several features of the shell and its internal organization that the shell in this genus is carried with its principal axis transverse to the longitudinal axis of the foot; that is, the spire is directed to the right. The flattened surface of the outer whorl thus rests upon the dorsal surface of the foot or upon the substratum when the animal is in a state of aestivation, a position which they had assumed in both instances.

References 
This article incorporates public domain text from the reference

External links 

Odontostomidae
Taxonomy articles created by Polbot